Sara Clapham (born 13 January 1985) is a former association football player who represented New Zealand at international level.

Clapham made her Football Ferns début in a 0–2 loss to Australia on 18 February 2004, and finished her international career with three caps to her credit.

Her brother Aaron Clapham was included in the New Zealand squad for the 2010 FIFA World Cup in South Africa

References

1985 births
Living people
New Zealand women's international footballers
New Zealand women's association footballers
Kennesaw State Owls women's soccer players
Women's association football midfielders